Arabian Coast is a "port-of-call" (themed land) at Tokyo DisneySea in the Tokyo Disney Resort.

Theming
The themed area recreates an Arabian harbor, combining the universe of the Disney movie Aladdin with the world from the 1001 Arabian Nights. As such, the architecture and atmosphere are inspired by many Middle-Eastern and Indian influences. Arabian Coast is the third Agrabah-themed land in a Disney park, the first being Adventureland Bazar in Disneyland Paris, and the second a recreation of this city in the Magic Kingdom.

Attractions and entertainment
 Jasmine's Flying Carpets
 The Magic Lamp Theater
 Caravan Carousel
 Sindbad's Storybook Voyage

Former
 Sindbad's Seven Voyages

Restaurants and refreshments

Current
 Casbah Food Court
 Flying Carpet Curry
 Royal Tandor
 Noodle Charmer
 Sultan's Oasis
 Open Sesame

Former
 Alibaba

Shopping
 Agrabah Marketplace
 Abu's Bazaar

References

External links
 TDR Fan - Arabian Coast Photos

 
Themed areas in Walt Disney Parks and Resorts
Tokyo DisneySea
Audio-Animatronic attractions
Amusement rides introduced in 2001
2001 establishments in Japan